The 2017 season is RoPS's 5th Veikkausliiga season since their promotion back to the top flight in 2012.

Squad

Transfers

Winter

In:

Out:

Summer

In:

Out:

Competitions

Veikkausliiga

League table

Results summary

Results by matchday

Results

Finnish Cup

Sixth Round

Knockout stage

Squad statistics

Appearances and goals

|-
|colspan="14"|Players away from the club on loan:
|-
|colspan="14"|Players who left RoPS during the season:

|}

Goal scorers

Disciplinary record

References

2017
RoPS